is a Japanese professional basketball player who plays for the Koshigaya Alphas of the B.League in Japan. He played for Japan national 3x3 team in 2013.

Personal
His younger brother Takumi Hasegawa plays for the Kawasaki Brave Thunders of the B.League.

References

External links
Stats in Japan

1984 births
Living people
Japanese men's basketball players
Koshigaya Alphas players
San-en NeoPhoenix players
People from Hanamaki, Iwate
Sportspeople from Iwate Prefecture
Otsuka Corporation Alphas players
Forwards (basketball)